Derek Richard Corrigan is a Canadian politician and the former longtime mayor of Burnaby, British Columbia, Canada.

Early life and education
Corrigan is a graduate of Vancouver's Sir Charles Tupper Secondary School and studied political science and philosophy at the University of British Columbia. He then obtained his law degree from the same university in 1977 and joined the Bar of British Columbia in 1978.

Corrigan first articled to and then practised as associate counsel with James Lorimer until May 1978. He was a partner in Corrigan, Bernardino, Dorman and Baker from 1978 until 1990. After that he practised in association with Joanne Challenger and Paul McMurray, both criminal defence counsel, for several years, and then was associate counsel with the Vancouver law firm Lindsay Kenney. Corrigan practised primarily as criminal defence counsel. 

After several unsuccessful attempts, he became a city councillor of the Burnaby City Council in 1987 and served for 15 years. He was elected mayor in 2002 and re-elected in 2005, 2008, 2011, and 2014. 

In the 2018 election, Corrigan lost to Mike Hurley. Corrigan's loss is credited to his stance on affordable housing and the rapid rate of renters being evicted in favour of condo development.

Personal life
In 2009, Corrigan's wife, Kathy, was elected to the Legislative Assembly of British Columbia as the New Democratic MLA for Burnaby-Deer Lake.  She did not seek re-election in 2017.

References

Living people
Lawyers in British Columbia
Mayors of Burnaby
Politicians from Vancouver
Peter A. Allard School of Law alumni
University of British Columbia alumni
Year of birth missing (living people)